
 
 

White Dam Conservation Park (formerly the White's Dam Conservation Park and the White National Parks Reserve) is a protected area located in the Australian state of South Australia in the localities of Lindley and Maude about  north-east of the state capital of Adelaide and about  north-west of the town of Morgan.

The conservation park consists of land in the Sections 197, 199, 201 and 202 in the cadastral unit of the Hundred of Lindley and Section 252 of the Hundred of Maude. The conservation park consists of a strip of land along alternative sides of the Goyder Highway on its route form Morgan in the south-east to Burra in the north-west.

The land first received protected area status as the White National Parks Reserve in respect to land in section 202 of the Hundred of Lindley and was proclaimed in 17 July 1969 under the National Parks Act 1966. On 17 September 1970, the remainder of the current extent was added. On 27 April 1972, the national parks reserve was reconstituted as the White’s Dam Conservation Park under the National Parks and Wildlife Act 1972. On 12 May 1983, its name was altered to White Dam Conservation Park.

In 1994, the conservation park was described as follows:
The black oak (Allocasuarina cristata) low open woodland has an understorey dominated by bluebush (Mareana sedifolia) . Other understorey species present include spear grass (Stipa sp.), emubush (Eremophila sp.), Electrion sp., false sandalwood (Myoporum platycarpum), quondong (Santalum acumintum), and nitrebush (Nitraria billardierei)...

As of 1994, visitation was described as being “quite low” despite the “significant numbers of people” using the Goyder Highway.

The conservation park is classified as an IUCN Category Ia protected area.

See also
Protected areas of South Australia

References

External links
White Dam Conservation Park webpage on the Protected Planet website
White Dam Conservation Park webpage on the BirdsSA website

Conservation parks of South Australia
Protected areas established in 1969
1969 establishments in Australia